Denise White is an American entrepreneur and crisis manager. Since 1996, she has served as CEO and founder of EAG Sports Management, a sports firm for professional athletes. She has also served as a CNN contributor for sports and crisis management stories.

Early life and career
Born in Escondido, California, White represented Oregon in the 1994 Miss USA pageant, broadcast live from South Padre Island, Texas on February 11, 1994, where she obtained the Congeniality Award, an honor she had previously received while competing for the Miss Oregon USA title.

Early in her career, she worked as a broadcast news reporter in Portland, Oregon.

Sports management career
In 1996, White founded EAG Sports Management. Notable clients include NFL players such as Tony Gonzalez, Jared Allen, Vince Young, Terrell Suggs, Tyrann Mathieu, Patrick Peterson, DeSean Jackson, Jarvis Landry, and NBA players such as Joe Johnson and Austin Rivers; and UFC fighters including Jon "Bones" Jones.

In 2010, White matched a $2500 donation by Jared Allen to an animal shelter for information leading to the arrest and conviction of the person responsible for abandoning a starving horse in LA.

White's managerial style has earned her a notable reputation among sports news outlets, with CNN and others referring to her as "the Olivia Pope of the sports world," a reference to the fictional crisis manager protagonist in the series Scandal. In 2014, Men's Journal published "The Woman Who Bails Out the NFL's Bad Boys", a lengthy profile of White detailing her career.

White sits on the board of her client Brandon Marshall's mental health awareness foundation Project 375.

Biopic
In March 2016, it was announced that FOX2000 had acquired the film rights to the Men's Journal profile "The Woman Who Bails Out the NFL's Bad Boys". Written by Dallas Buyers Club co-writer Melisa Wallack, the film is titled The Fixer and would star Jennifer Aniston as White. Aniston is also attached as producer.

A television series about White's life titled Hail Mary is also reportedly in development.

References

External links
EAG Sports Management

Year of birth missing (living people)
Living people
Businesspeople from California
Miss USA 1994 delegates
People from Escondido, California
20th-century American people